Florencia Vicenta de Casillas-Martínez Cardona (born July 19, 1940), known by her stage name Vikki Carr, is an American vocalist. She has a singing career that spans more than four decades. Born in El Paso, Texas, to Mexican parents, she has performed in a variety of musical genres, including pop, jazz and country, while her greatest success has come from singing in Spanish. She established the Vikki Carr Scholarship Foundation in 1971. Vikki Carr has won three Grammys and was honored with a Lifetime Achievement Award at the Latin Grammys in 2008 at the 9th Annual Latin Grammy Awards.

Career

Cardona was born in El Paso, Texas, on July 19, 1940. In 1958, she graduated from Rosemead High School in Rosemead, California, in a class that included famed fashion designer Bob Mackie. Under the stage name "Vikki Carr" she signed with Liberty Records in 1962. Her first single to achieve success was "He's a Rebel", which in 1962 reached No. 3 in Australia and No. 115 in the United States. Producer Phil Spector heard Carr cutting the song in the studio and immediately recorded a cover version which reached No. 1 in the United States, billed as the Crystals, although this was in fact incorrect as the actual recording artists were the Blossoms. In 1966, Carr toured South Vietnam with actor/comedian Danny Kaye to entertain American troops. The following year, her album It Must Be Him was nominated for three Grammy Awards. The title track reached No. 3 on the Billboard Hot 100 in the United States in 1967, sold more than 1 million copies and received a gold disc. 

Carr followed with 2 US Top 40 hits: 1968's "The Lesson" and 1969's "With Pen in Hand". Around this time, Dean Martin called her "the best girl singer in the business". In total, Carr had 10 singles and 13 albums that made the US pop charts.

In 1968, Carr taped six specials for London Weekend TV. She appeared on various television programs, such as ABC's The Bing Crosby Show in the 1964–1965 season. In 1970, she was named "Woman of the Year" by the Los Angeles Times.  There were frequent television appearances. A favorite of Johnny Carson's, she appeared more than 30 times on The Tonight Show Starring Johnny Carson, even hosting on occasion. 

She received a star on the Hollywood Walk of Fame in 1981. Carr also achieved the rare feat of singing for five presidents during her career: Richard Nixon, Gerald Ford, Ronald Reagan, George Bush and Bill Clinton.

In the 1980s and 1990s, Carr had enormous success in the Latin music world, winning Grammy Awards for Best Mexican-American Performance in 1986 for her album Simplemente Mujer, Best Latin Pop Album in 1992 for Cosas del Amor and Best Mexican-American Performance in 1995 for Recuerdo a Javier Solís. She also received Grammy nominations for the discs Brindo a La Vida, Al Bolero, A Ti (1993) and Emociones (1996). Her numerous Spanish-language hit singles include "Total", "Discúlpame", "Déjame", "Hay Otro en Tu Lugar", "Esos Hombres", "Mala Suerte" and "Cosas del Amor". "Cosas del Amor" spent more than two months at No. 1 on the US Latin charts in 1991, her biggest Spanish-language US hit. Her Spanish-language albums have been certified gold and platinum in Mexico, Chile, Puerto Rico, Venezuela, Costa Rica, Colombia and Ecuador. She also voiced Georgette in the Latin American dub of Disney's Oliver & Company.

In 1999, Carr taped a PBS TV special, Vikki Carr: Memories, Memorias, in which she performed popular bilingual tunes from the 1940s and 1950s. Her guests were Pepe Aguilar, Arturo Sandoval and Jack Jones. In 2001, she released a bilingual holiday album, The Vikki Carr Christmas Album.

Carr appeared to great acclaim in a 2002 Los Angeles production of the Stephen Sondheim musical Follies, which also featured Hal Linden, Patty Duke and Harry Groener. In 2006, Carr made a cameo appearance in a straight-to-video thriller called Puerto Vallarta Squeeze. Carr hosted a PBS TV special in 2008, Fiesta Mexicana, which celebrated the music and dance of Mexico. Later that year she was honored with a Lifetime Achievement Award from the Latin Recording Academy. Carr marked the occasion with an appearance on the Latin Grammy telecast, in which she performed "Cosas del Amor" with Olga Tañón and Jenni Rivera.

In 2014, Vikki was invited by producer Gerry Gallagher to record with Latin rock legends El Chicano, Alphonse Mouzon, Brian Auger, Alex Ligertwood, Salvador Santana, Ray Parker Jr., Lenny Castro, Siedah Garrett, Walfredo Reyes Jr., Pete Escovedo, Peter Michael Escovedo, Jessy J, Marcos J. Reyes and David Paich, and is featured on a remake of the Latin classic "Sabor A Mi" from a 2019 Gallagher studio album. In August, she headlined a benefit in El Paso for the Walmart shooting victims of the 2019 El Paso shooting.

Personal life
Carr has been married three times, first to producer and entertainment attorney Dann Moss, then paint company executive Michael Nilsson. She was married to San Antonio, Texas, physician Dr. Pedro De Leon from 1993 until his death in 2019.

The bicultural nature of her career has included recording with Vicente Fernandez and Pepe Aguilar, as well as Frank Sinatra and Dean Martin.

Charitable work
Carr devotes time to charities including the United Way, the American Lung Association, the Muscular Dystrophy Association, and St. Jude Children’s Research Hospital. For 22 years, she hosted benefit concerts to support Holy Cross of San Antonio Middle and High School in San Antonio, Texas. In 1971, she established the Vikki Carr Scholarship Foundation dedicated to offering college scholarships to Hispanic students in California and Texas. The foundation, since 2018 partnered with the San Antonio Area Foundation, has awarded more than 280 scholarships totaling more than $250,000.

Discography

Albums

Singles

1960s and 1970s
 Years represent year of release, not necessarily the chart peak year.

1980s to the present

Cultural references
In the Family Guy episode "Total Recall", Peter remarks, "So what? She can name a kind of car. Big whoop, I can do that, too. Vikki. Vikki Carr".
At a November 12, 1974 state dinner, Don Penny was dancing with Betty Ford while President Gerald Ford was dancing with Vikki Carr. Carr asked the president "What’s your favorite Mexican dish?" to which he replied, "You are." Betty Ford was not amused.
In the 1987 film Moonstruck, Cosmo is a fan of the singer, and Rose remarks "Now he's going to play that damn Vikki Carr record and when he comes to bed he won't touch me."
In The Nanny season 2 episode "Strange Bedfellows", several nannies celebrate the retirement of Mona, played by Tyne Daly. Bemoaning how little she received after devoting her life to raising the children of other people, Mona says "you give somebody's kids the best years of your life and what do you get? A pat on the back and a couple of stinking Vikki Carr CDs."
 During the first episode of Monty Python's Flying Circus, the credits include John Cleese saying "The final score, Pigs 9, British Bipeds 4. The Pigs go on to face Vikki Carr in the finals."

References

External links

Vikki Carr Exclusive Booking Agents ~ Paradise Artists

[ Vikki Carr at Billboard.com]
"In the Spotlight with Vikki Carr" hosted by Ron Roberts. A one-hour monthly internet radio program streaming worldwide, devoted to the music of Vikki Carr: 3:00 – 4:00pm NYT, with rebroadcasts as per the program schedule.

 01
American women pop singers
Mexican singers
Traditional pop music singers
1940 births
Living people
Grammy Award winners
Latin Grammy Lifetime Achievement Award winners
American performers of Latin music
Cabaret singers
Torch singers
Ranchera singers
Spanish-language singers of the United States
American musicians of Mexican descent
Musicians from El Paso, Texas
Columbia Records artists
Liberty Records artists
20th-century American singers
21st-century American singers
20th-century American women singers
21st-century American women singers
Hispanic and Latino American musicians
Hispanic and Latino American women singers
Women in Latin music